The 2018 Space Coast Pro Tennis Classic was a professional tennis tournament played on outdoor clay courts. It was the thirteenth edition of the tournament and was part of the 2018 ITF Women's Circuit. It took place in Indian Harbour Beach, United States, on 9–15 April 2018.

Singles main draw entrants

Seeds 

 1 Rankings as of 2 April 2018.

Other entrants 
The following players received a wildcard into the singles main draw:
  Quinn Gleason
  Jessica Pegula
  Amanda Rodgers
  Maria Sanchez

The following players received entry from the qualifying draw:
  Ann Li
  Nicole Melichar
  Ingrid Neel
  Emmanuelle Salas

Champions

Singles

 Caroline Dolehide def.  Irina Bara, 6–4, 7–5

Doubles
 
 Irina Bara /  Sílvia Soler Espinosa def.  Jessica Pegula /  Maria Sanchez, 6–4, 6–2

External links 
 Official website
 2018 Space Coast Pro Tennis Classic at ITFtennis.com

2018 ITF Women's Circuit
2018 in American tennis
Tennis tournaments in Florida